Government Johnson College is an educational institution located near police headquarters, Shivaji Tillah, Khatla, Aizawl, Mizoram.  It is currently affiliated with Mizoram University.

History

Bungkawn College: Bungkawn college traces its beginning when the community leaders of Bungkawn had the objective of beginning academic pursuits closer to students in the neighborhood. On 20 May 1992, Bungkawn College was established and the private college solely depends on the financial contribution made by the local community. Following  the policy of Government of Mizoram, it was amalgamated with Johnson College, Khatla on 24 October 2002.

Johnson College: Previously named Khatla Arts and Commerce College, it was established on 27 July 1993 by community leaders of Khatla, Aizawl. The college is named after Mr P.P. John, an education-minded and a prominent resident of Khatla, who generously donated a sum of ₹12 lakhs. Consequently, the commerce stream was dropped and the Institution renamed Johnson college.

Departments
The college has the following departments:
 Department of English
 Department of Mizo
 Department of History
 Department of Education
 Department of Political Science
 Department of Economics

See also
Education in India
Education in Mizoram
Mizoram University
Literacy in India

References

External links
 

Universities and colleges in Mizoram
Colleges affiliated to Mizoram University
Education in Aizawl